"Angelia" is a ballad recorded by Richard Marx and the third released single on his second album, Repeat Offender.

"Angelia" reached number 2 on the Cash Box singles chart, and reached number 4 on the US Billboard Hot 100 chart on December 2, 1989. It was also a top-40 hit in Australia and made the top 50 in the UK. On the Billboard Adult Contemporary chart, "Angelia" peaked at number 2 for several weeks behind the Linda Ronstadt/Aaron Neville duet "Don't Know Much".

Background
Richard Marx based the sound of "Angelia" on Def Leppard's 1983 album Pyromania and the 1987 album Hysteria. During recordings of "Angelia", engineer and co-producer David Cole along with Richard Marx tried to copy the sounds of the guitars and drums that Def Leppard and producer Robert "Mutt" Lange had used on the Hysteria and Pyromania records.

During a night out with Def Leppard guitarist Phil Collen, Richard Marx was told that Def Leppard attempted to emulate Angelia for a song that was to appear on the next Def Leppard album, Adrenalize. The song Def Leppard recorded with "Angelia" in mind was likely the hit "Stand Up (Kick Love Into Motion)".

The production and sound of the song "Angelia" is Richard Marx's favorite from his second album, Repeat Offender. Michael Landau played the guitar solo on the song.

Personnel
 Richard Marx – lead and backing vocals
 C. J. Vanston – keyboards, arrangements
 Bruce Gaitsch – guitar
 Michael Landau – guitar, guitar solo
 Jim Cliff – bass
 Prairie Prince – drums
 Marc Russo – saxophone

Track listing
All songs written Richard Marx and produced by Marx and David Cole.

 "Angelia" – 4:08
 "Endless Summer Nights" [Live at the Palace Theatre] – 5:44

Charts

Weekly charts

Year-end charts

References

1989 singles
1989 songs
1980s ballads
Richard Marx songs
Songs written by Richard Marx
Rock ballads
RPM Top Singles number-one singles
Music videos directed by Michael Bay
Capitol Records singles